Slavi Kostenski (born 21 March 1981) is a former Bulgarian footballer who played as a defender. He is the head coach at Chernomorets Burgas.

Career
Kostenski was raised in Chernomorets Burgas's youth teams. Then he played for Slavia Sofia and kazakhstani football club FC Irtysh.

In 2012 Kostenski moved to Gozo, Malta and signed with Xagħra United, where he played 13 matches and scored 2 goals.

References

External links
Profile at Sportal.bg

1981 births
Living people
Bulgarian footballers
First Professional Football League (Bulgaria) players
FC Chernomorets Burgas players
PFC Slavia Sofia players
FC Irtysh Pavlodar players
PFC Chernomorets Burgas players
PFC Nesebar players
PFC Spartak Varna players
FC Chernomorets Balchik players
FC Pomorie players
Expatriate footballers in Kazakhstan
Bulgarian expatriate sportspeople in Kazakhstan
Association football defenders
Bulgarian football managers